The Laseron Islands are a chain of small ice-capped and rocky islands lying  east of Cape Denison in Commonwealth Bay, Antarctica. They were discovered by the Australasian Antarctic Expedition (1911–14) under Douglas Mawson, who named them for Charles F. Laseron, taxidermist with the expedition.

See also 
 List of Antarctic and sub-Antarctic islands

References 

Islands of George V Land